Agostino is a 1962 Italian drama film directed by Mauro Bolognini. It was filmed in Rome and Venice. It was the first of many movies John Saxon would make in Italy.

The film is based on a successful short novel of the same name by Alberto Moravia, who had collaborated with Bolognini on his  previous film, From a Roman Balcony.

Cast 
 Ingrid Thulin as Agostino's mother
 Paolo Colombo as Agostino 
 John Saxon as Renzo 
Mario Bartoletti as Saro

References

External links

1962 films
Italian drama films
Films directed by Mauro Bolognini
Films based on Italian novels
Films based on works by Alberto Moravia
Films scored by Carlo Rustichelli
1962 drama films
1960s Italian-language films
English-language Italian films
1960s Italian films